Deral Teteak (December 11, 1929 – December 18, 2014) was an American football guard and linebacker who played in the National Football League for the Green Bay Packers.

Teteak was born on December 11, 1929, the son of Miles Teteak and Aritha Hansen Teteak. He attended Oshkosh High School and the University of Wisconsin–Madison. After playing for the Packers, he worked as an assistant coach at the University of Wisconsin.

Teteak died on December 18, 2014 in a nursing home in Naples, Florida at the age of 85. He was married for almost 60 years to his wife, Shirley. He had a son, Peter, and a daughter, Lynn.

References

1929 births
2014 deaths
People from Oconto, Wisconsin
Players of American football from Wisconsin
American football offensive linemen
Wisconsin Badgers football players
Green Bay Packers players
Western Conference Pro Bowl players